Inca Kola (also known as "the Golden Kola" in international advertising) is a soft drink that was created in Peru in 1935 by British immigrant Joseph Robinson Lindley. Americans compare its flavor to bubblegum or cream soda, and it is sometimes categorized as a champagne cola.

The Coca-Cola Company owns the Inca Kola trademark everywhere but in Peru.

Inca Kola is a source of national pride and patriotism in Peru. Inca Kola is available in parts of South America, North America and Europe, and while it has not enjoyed major success outside Peru, it can be found in Latin American specialty shops worldwide. Inca Kola is sold in bottles and cans and has an Inca motif.

History

In 1910, in Rímac, one of Lima's oldest and most traditional neighborhoods, an immigrant English family began a small bottling company under their family name, Lindley. In 1928, the company was formally chartered in Peru as Corporación José R. Lindley S.A., whereupon Joseph R. Lindley became its first General Manager.

By the early 1930s, the company had a line of ten flavors of soda including Orange Squash, Lemon Squash, Champagne Kola, and Cola Rosada. In 1935, on the occasion of the 400th anniversary of Lima's founding, Lindley introduced what was to become its most noted product, Inca Kola, whose flavor was based on Lemon Verbena (Hierbaluisa or ). He had experimented with various mixtures, other ingredients and levels of carbonation, until finally he came up with this combination of thirteen special plant-derived flavors. The company launched "Inca Kola" under the slogan "There is only one Inca Kola and it's like no other".

By the mid-1940s, Inca Kola was a market leader in Lima due to an aggressive advertising campaign. Appealing to the Peruvian nationalism that was prevalent among the population, the company positioned Inca Kola as a traditional Peruvian drink, using national and indigenous iconography and images. This advertising campaign was very successful, and bottling volume expanded greatly.

Inca Kola reached levels of 38% market penetration by 1970, eclipsing all other carbonated drinks in Peru and firmly establishing itself as "Peru's Drink". A common logo in the late 1970s and early 1980s featured the slogan "Made of National Flavor!", later changed to "The taste of Peru".

On January 22, 2009, Inca Kola partnered with D'Onofrio, an iconic Peruvian ice cream brand owned by Nestlé, to launch an Inca Kola flavored ice pop.

In the United States, Inca Kola is manufactured by the Coca-Cola company and sold in supermarkets in  bottles, cans, and individual bottles.

It also sells a diet version.

Competition
In 1995, Coca-Cola had 32% of the market share of soda sales in Peru while Inca Kola had 32.9%. Since that year, however, the market share for Inca Kola has increased due to some fast food chains including it in their menus. Bembos, a Peruvian fast-food chain, switched from serving Coca-Cola to Inca Kola in 1995. Due to popular demand, McDonald's also began to serve Inca Kola at its locations in Peru in 1995, before Coca-Cola owned the Inca Kola brand (at the time, the only place in the world where Coca-Cola agreed to such an arrangement).

Lindley underwent corporate restructuring in 1997. The expansion resulted in a debt load that took a heavy toll, and Lindley lost almost $5 million in 1999. The company, looking for outside help, turned to the Coca-Cola Co., which acquired half of Inca Kola Perú and one-fifth of Corporación José R. Lindley S.A. for an undisclosed sum believed to have been about $200 million. Johnny Lindley Taboada, a grandson of the founder and chairman of Corporación José R. Lindley S.A., became chairman of the joint venture between Coke and Inca Kola. Coca-Cola became the sole owner of the Inca Kola trademark everywhere outside Peru whereas inside Peru a joint-venture agreement was forged.  To date, Ecuador and the United States (mostly New York and the rest of the Northeast) are two of the countries where Inca Kola is bottled by the Coca-Cola Company.

During the time that the two giants were negotiating, various smaller companies began to emerge in Peru, selling drinks that competed both with Coca-Cola (Peru Cola, Cola Nacional, Inti Cola, Kola Real, etc.) and Inca Kola (Isaac Kola, Triple Kola, Concordia, Oro etc.). Their main selling point was the fact that Inca Kola was no longer a Peruvian company, having sold out to a foreign company, and therefore not deserving of their money.

During 2004, Corporación José R. Lindley S.A. started talks to buy out Embotelladora Latinoamericana S.A., a bottling business that had been bottling Inca Kola since 1973. They complained that the price of Inca Kola concentrate had increased sixfold since the merger with Coca-Cola. Consequently, they cancelled their contract to bottle Inca Kola in 2000. As a result, in early 2005 Corporación José R. Lindley S.A. purchased two-thirds of Embotelladora Latinoamericana for $215 million. Corporación José R. Lindley S.A. now bottles Inca Kola as well as all the Coca-Cola products using these bottling facilities, with a combined market share of around 60%.

See also
 List of soft drinks by country
 Irn-Bru – a similarly flavored Scottish soft drink
 Isaac Kola - direct competitive brand
 Oro - direct competitive brand
 Triple Kola - direct competitive brand
 Viva - direct competitive brand

References

External links

 Inca Kola USA
 Inca Kola nutrition

Cola brands
Coca-Cola brands
Peruvian brands
Peruvian drinks
Soft drinks
Products introduced in 1935
Coca-Cola acquisitions